István Csala (2 November 1899 – 21 March 1987) was a Hungarian politician, who served as Minister of Agriculture between 1948 and 1949.

References
  Netlexikon - az online lexikon (címszó: Csala István)	

1899 births
1987 deaths
People from Cegléd
People from the Kingdom of Hungary
Independent Smallholders, Agrarian Workers and Civic Party politicians
Agriculture ministers of Hungary